Lieutenant-General Richard Lambart, 6th Earl of Cavan (died 2 November 1778) was an Anglo-Irish peer and soldier.

He was the son of Henry and Dorothea Lambart and succeeded his cousin Ford Lambart, 5th Earl of Cavan, to the earldom in 1772. His father was a younger son of the 3rd Earl of Cavan.

He joined the Army and became a Major-General in 1772 and a Lieutenant-General in 1777. He was appointed Colonel of the 55th Foot on 3 August 1774, transferring as Colonel to the 15th Foot on 7 September 1775, an appointment he held until his death.

He was elected to the Parliament of Ireland in 1773.

He died in 1778 and was buried in St. Patrick's Cathedral, Dublin. He married twice: firstly his cousin Sophia, daughter of Oliver Lambart (a younger son of Charles Lambart, 3rd Earl of Cavan); and secondly Elizabeth, the daughter and coheiress of William Davies (Commissioner of the Navy), with whom he had a son and a daughter. Furthermore, he was succeeded by his son Richard Lambart, 7th Earl of Cavan.

References

http://thepeerage.com/p20978.htm#i209772

1778 deaths
British Army lieutenant generals
55th Regiment of Foot officers
East Yorkshire Regiment officers
Year of birth missing
Earls of Cavan